The Principality of Muzaka (Albanian: Principata e Muzakajve) was an independent realm ruled by the Albanian Muzaka family with its capital at Berat, covering territories in Central and Southern Albania, and Western Macedonia. One of the first rulers was Andrea I Muzaka whose reign was recognized by the Byzantine Emperor. During the Battle of Savra, the Ottomans captured Berat from Balša II, together with Kruja and Ulcinj. They soon retreated from all of those towns keeping only Castoria under their permanent control. Some sources explain that Ottomans probably remained in Berat with intention to use it as foothold to capture Valona. By 1396 Muzaka family took over control of Berat. In 1417 the territories of the Principality, including Vlorë and Berat, became a part of the Ottoman Empire.

History
It's uncertain when the Muzaka family started to rule over Berat, however one of the first notable rulers known so far is Andrea I Muzaka who ruled over the region of Myzeqe. Principality of Berat separates into two periods of time, between the period of 1280 to 1343, and 1355 to 1417. Andrea I Muzaka established a de facto independent rule over Berat, he was also formally recognized by the Byzantine Emperor Andronikos II Palaiologos as he held the high Byzantine court title of sebastokrator. Some notable regions that were part of the Principality of Berat during this period are: Devoll, Berat, Skrapar, Tomorica, Selanica, Myzeqe, Korçe etc..

The Principality of Berat reached the peak of its power during the rule of Andrea II Muzaka who, according to the chronicle of Gjon Muzaka, defeated King Vukasin and was awarded with the title of Despot by the Emperor of Constantinople, the second highest title just below to that of Emperor. Andrea II expanded his territory to the maximum extent it would reach: from the Adriatic Sea between the Vjosa river and Devoll to the east, including Korça. In 1343 the Principality of Berat was conquered by the new Serbian Empire, but was recreated after that empire's fall in 1355. In an alliance with the Đurađ I Balšić, and the great lord of Ohrid Andrea Gropa, in 1372 Andrea Muzaka managed to also conquer Kostur from Prince Marko After the death of Andrea, the rule was passed to his son Teodor II Muzaka who in 1389 is said to have taken place in the Battle of Kosovo which had a great impact to the principality like to all other Albanian principalities of that time. Berat was conquered by the Ottoman Empire in 1417, but the Muzaka family would briefly regain their control in central Albania in 1444 after their alliance with Skanderbeg in the League of Lezhë, however after 6 years their territory would eventually be incorporated into the Ottoman Empire which would end the centuries-reign of the Muzaka noble family in Berat.

Monarchs

See also

 Arianiti
 Albanian principalities
 History of Albania

References

Lordship of Berat
Albanian principalities
Ottoman Albania
Former countries in the Balkans
Former monarchies